Varesh Airlines is an Iranian airline. It initially concentrated its activities in Mazandaran province, then expanded into the Iranian domestic and international markets when it first served Bishkek, Kyrgyzstan. Its central hub is in Dasht-e Naz Airport.
Now The company operates its flights mostly from Tehran to Most major cities in Iran like Mashad - Kish - Bandar Abbas - Bushehr - Ahwaz - - Shiraz - Isfahan - Chabahar - Abadan, ..

History 

Varesh Airline started operating on 8 October 2018, connecting Tehran and Mashhad.

Khors Air, a company based in Kyiv, Ukraine, leased out a Boeing 737-300 to Varesh Airlines in August 2018, and a Boeing 737-500 in November 2018.

A  Varesh Airlines aircraft landed in the Tajik capital, Dushanbe, on 6 June 2019. This marked the restart of an eight-month break between the two countries. The Iranian Embassy announced the resumption to enhance the two countries' bilateral relations.

Currently, Varesh Airline owns 5 Aircraft, including a Boeing 737-300 and a Boeing 737-500. The main hub, Dasht-e Naz Airport, is located in Central District of Mazandaran Province, Iran.

Aziz Nabizoda, deputy head of the Tajik Civil Aviation Agency, cancelled all flights due to the COVID-19 pandemic on February 24, 2020. According to the Iranian Embassy in Dushanbe, on 3 February 2020 the Iranian airline resumed flights from Tehran to Dushanbe and Bishkek, Kyrgyzstan.

Destinations 

As of September 2021, Varesh Airlines serves 11 domestic destinations and one international destination:

See also
 List of airlines of Iran

References

Airlines of Iran
Iranian brands